Arman Ramezani is an Iranian professional footballer who plays as a forward for Iranian football club Esteghlal in the Persian Gulf Pro League.

Club career

Malavan
He joined to first team by Farhad Pourgholami and made his debut for Malavan in 2013–14 Iran Pro League against Gahar as a substitute.

Persepolis 
On 8 September 2020, Ramezani signed a two-year contract with Persian Gulf Pro League champions Persepolis.

Club career statistics

Honours

Persepolis
AFC Champions League runner-up: 2020

Esteghlal
Hazfi Cup runner-up: 2020–21
Iran Pro League: 2021–22
Iranian Super Cup: 2022

References

External links
 Arman Ramezani  at IranLeague.ir
 

Living people
Iranian footballers
Malavan players
1992 births
Association football forwards
Fajr Sepasi players
Saipa F.C. players
Persepolis F.C. players
Esteghlal F.C. players